Corktown Common is a park in the south eastern portion of the West Don Lands neighbourhood in Toronto, Ontario, Canada which opened in 2013. It borders the   Don River to the east. It was built on remediated industrial lands to be the centrepiece of a new emerging neighbourhood in downtown Toronto. It also provides a barrier to flooding from the Don River.

History

The West Don Lands, including what is now the Corktown Common, was once an industrialized area, once notably occupied by the pork processing plants of the William Davies Company and acres of railyards. After mergers in the packed meat industry, pork processing moved gradually away from the site. By the 1970s, much of the land was left abandoned. In 1987, the West Don Lands was expropriated by the Government of Ontario in order to build a new community known as Atatiri. The industrial history meant the soil was highly polluted and needed expensive cleanup before any residents could live there. The risk of flooding from the Don River also required a flood barrier to be erected. By 1992 the city and province had already invested some $350 million in purchasing and clearing the site, and new estimates put the final cost at more than a billion more. The real estate market had also collapsed, making any private investment unlikely. The new Ontario government of Bob Rae thus decided to cancel the project in 1992 and the West Don Lands was left deserted for the next 15 years.

In the 2000s, the site was shown renewed interest after the formation of Waterfront Toronto, a joint venture of the City of Toronto, the Government of Ontario and the Government of Canada. The agency's purpose was to reclaim the waterfront for development after decades of decay. The announcement of Toronto winning the 2015 Pan American Games meant that the governments would spend money to reclaim the area for the Games Athletes' Village, before reallocating the buildings for private residential usage.

The Commons site itself is located in the flood plain of the Don River and required soil remediation. Also, the Athletes' Village and surrounding site required the building of flood protection before any development could occur. The Common's berm is a flood protection landform which was started in 2007 and was necessary before any other development of the West Don Lands could occur. The berm also meant clean soil was brought to the site to make it suitable for recreation.

Park description
The Corktown Common was a  project and it is a hilly park with pathways and prairie grasses, overlooking the mouth of the Don River, which doubles as a -high berm designed to protect the eastern downtown from a major flood, even a 500-year storm by shunting potential flood waters south toward the lake. Its name before it opened was the Don River Park. The park was designed by Michael Van Valkenburgh Associates, and opened with over 700 trees and thousands of shrubs and grasses that are native to Southern Ontario's Carolinian forest ecosystem.

The park contains playgrounds, a splash pad, an athletic field, open lawns, a marsh, tables, benches, a barbecue, a fireplace, bike paths, a boardwalk and an off-leash dog area. There is a public art sculpture titled No Shoes by Mark di Suvero. On the river side of the park, there is a 3.2 hectare (7.9 acre) urban prairie.

The Corktown Common is located east of Bayview Avenue, south of King Street, west of GO/CN railroad lines and the Don River to the rail corridor in the south. There is also an entrance from the Don Valley Trail.

See also
 2015 Pan American Games Athletes' Village

References

External links
 Corktown Common Official Website
 Friends of Corktown Common

Parks in Toronto
Waterfront Toronto